Cryptocarya foetida is a rainforest tree growing at the eastern coastal parts of Australia. The common name is due to the allegedly offensive odour given by the flowers. The stinking cryptocarya or stinking laurel is considered vulnerable to extinction with a ROTAP rating of 3VC.

Habitat 
Growing on littoral rainforest on sand between Iluka, New South Wales and Fraser Island in Queensland. Much of the habitat of Cryptocarya foetida was destroyed by repeated burnings and clearing for seaside housing and development.

Description 

Cryptocarya foetida is a small or medium-sized tree up to 20 metres tall and 20 cm in diameter with a dark green crown.

The trunk is greyish brown, slightly fissured, cylindrical, not buttressed but slightly flanged at the base.

Leaves are typical of many Australian laurels. Alternate, simple, not toothed, ovate to ovate lanceolate, smooth, thick and shiny with a transparent margin, tapering to a blunt point. 8 to 13 cm long by 4 to 5 cm broad. The yellowish venation is conspicuous, particularly on the underside.

Cream flowers appear in summer. The fruit matures in winter, being purplish/black globular drupe, around 8 to 10 mm in diameter. Like most Australian Cryptocarya fruit, removal of the fleshy aril is advised to assist seed germination.

Gallery

References

External links

Flora of New South Wales
Flora of Queensland
foetida
Laurales of Australia
Trees of Australia
Vulnerable biota of Queensland
Vulnerable flora of Australia
Taxa named by Richard Thomas Baker